is a sub-temple of Sennyū-ji in Kyoto, Japan. Founded in 1372, it was rebuilt after destruction in the Ōnin War. The Hondō of 1646 (13.8m x 12.9m, irimoya-zukuri, shake roof) is an Important Cultural Property. The Hōjō or abbot's quarters also date from the Edo period. A Kamakura period copy of the Lotus sutra has been designated an Important Cultural Property.

See also

Sennyū-ji

References

External links
 Unryū-in homepage

Buddhist temples in Kyoto
Important Cultural Properties of Japan